UML Partners was a consortium of system integrators and vendors convened in 1996 to specify the Unified Modeling Language (UML). Initially the consortium was led by Grady Booch, Ivar Jacobson, and James Rumbaugh of Rational Software. The UML Partners' UML 1.0 specification draft was proposed to the Object Management Group (OMG) in January 1997. 
During the same month the UML Partners formed a Semantics Task Force, chaired by Cris Kobryn, to finalize the semantics of the specification and integrate it with other standardization efforts. The result of this work, UML 1.1, was submitted to the OMG in August 1997 and adopted by the OMG in November 1997.

Member list
Members of the consortium include:

Digital Equipment Corporation
Hewlett-Packard
i-Logix
IBM
ICON Computing
IntelliCorp
MCI Systemhouse
Microsoft
ObjecTime
Oracle Corporation
Platinum Technology
Ptech
Rational Software
Reich Technologies
Softeam
Taskon
Texas Instruments
Unisys

See also
Unified Modeling Language
object-oriented language

References

External links
2001: A Standardization Odyssey PDF document
UML 1.0 - 1.1 and the UML partners

Unified Modeling Language
Information technology organizations